Shopping arcades in Cardiff include indoor shopping centres and arcades in Cardiff city centre, Wales. Cardiff is known as the "City of Arcades", due to the highest concentration of Victorian, Edwardian and contemporary indoor shopping arcades in any British city.

Up until the 1790s there were only 25 retail shops in Cardiff.  Most shopping at that time was made from market stalls. The opening of the Royal Arcade in 1858, which was the first indoor arcade built in Cardiff, significantly increased the number of shops in Cardiff.

Cardiff's Victorian arcades have been attracting new shops and customers since emerging from the economic recession. Existing retailers have expanded which demonstrates resurgence of the capital's unique shopping malls, according to the landlords, Curzon, who is responsible for the High Street, Castle, Duke Street and Wyndham arcades. The area around the arcades will be affected by pedestrianisation of High Street in late 2010, to create the £2.5m Castle Quarter. This is expected to attract more shoppers and tourists to the Victorian arcades.

The total length of Cardiff's city centre arcades is 797 m (2,655 ft).


Current shopping arcades

Victorian and Edwardian

Contemporary

Former shopping arcades

See also 
 List of places in Cardiff
 List of cultural venues in Cardiff
 List of leading shopping streets and districts by city

Notes

External links 
 
 

Tourist attractions in Cardiff
 
Shopping arcades